Melvin John Bridgman (born April 28, 1955) is a Canadian former professional ice hockey centre who played 14 seasons in the National Hockey League (NHL) from 1975–76 until 1988–89. He featured in two Stanley Cup Finals with the Flyers (1976, 1980). Bridgman was born in Trenton, Ontario, but grew up in Thunder Bay, Ontario, before moving to Victoria, British Columbia.

After his playing career, he earned his MBA from the Wharton School of the University of Pennsylvania.

In 1992, Bridgman was the first general manager of the modern-day Ottawa Senators of the NHL.

Playing career
Bridgman was drafted first overall by the Philadelphia Flyers in the 1975 NHL Amateur Draft. He played 977 career NHL games, scoring 252 goals and 449 assists for 701 points, as well as adding 1625 penalty minutes. His best offensive season was the 1981–82 season, when he set career highs with 33 goals, 54 assists, and 87 points. Throughout his career Bridgman was known as a consistent offensive contributor, a smart defensive centre, and a gritty, hard-nosed, power forward who would check and fight regularly.

Career statistics

Regular season and playoffs

International

Awards
Bob Brownridge Memorial Trophy (WCHL leading scorer) - 1975
 WCHL All-Star Team – 1975

References

External links
 
Meltzer, Bill Flyers Heroes of the Past: Mel Bridgman at philadelphiaflyers.com

1955 births
Living people
Adirondack Red Wings players
Calgary Flames players
Canadian ice hockey centres
Denver Spurs draft picks
Detroit Red Wings players
Ice hockey people from Ontario
Nanaimo Clippers players
National Hockey League first-overall draft picks
National Hockey League first-round draft picks
National Hockey League general managers
New Jersey Devils players
Ottawa Senators general managers
People from Quinte West
Philadelphia Flyers captains
Philadelphia Flyers draft picks
Philadelphia Flyers players
Sportspeople from Thunder Bay
Vancouver Canucks players
Victoria Cougars (WHL) players